Radúz and Mahulena is an 1898 stage play by Czech novelist Julius Zeyer. It was made into a film in 1970, directed by Petr Weigl.

Story 

Zeyer's dramatic poem is a love story, combining classical fairy-tale motifs with mythological references. Radúz and Mahulena, from feuding kingdoms, fall in love, but have to face various challenges, including the sorcery of Queen Runa. As well as Slovak myths and fairy tales, the story also draws from the Indian drama Shakuntala by the poet Kalidasa.

Film cast 
Directed by Petr Weigl. 

Magda Vašaryová as Mahulena
Jan Tříska as Radúz
Jiří Adamíra as Stojmír
Vladimír Ráž as Radovíd
Jaroslava Adamová as Runa 
Nada Urbánková as Prija
Jaroslava Obermaierová as Živa
Dana Medřická as Nyola
Václav Mareš as Pribina
Vladimír Menšík as Vratko
Marie Popelková as Maid of Honour
Jiří Hospoda as Lover
František Michálek as Herold
Richard Záhorský as Sawyer
Petr Svojtka as Singer
Miroslav Kura as Dancer

References

External links 
IMDb.com (Film)
Czechoslovak Film Database (Czech and Slovak)
Reading-Book (Czech)

Czech plays
Plays by Julius Zeyer
1898 plays
Plays based on fairy tales
Plays based on other plays